SUN TV (சன் தொலைக்காட்சி) is an Indian Tamil-language General entertainment pay television channel owned by Sun TV Network. It was launched on 14 April 1993. It is the flagship channel of the Chennai-based media conglomerate Sun Group's Sun TV Network. It was founded and is owned by Kalanithi Maran. It was started airing on open network (Antenna) on 14 July 2002 at the time of ''Majunu" Tamil movie premiering. Then it was removed from this open network on 2005. It was also removed from free on 9 November 2007. Sun TV launched its HD version on 11 December 2011.

Since its inception, the channel consistently remains the top rated Tamil channel and one of the top rated Indian television channel.

History
Sun TV is the flagship channel of Sun TV Network which started on the Tamil New Year, 14 April 1993.

It started off with a four and a half hour programming per day on a time sharing agreement with ATN. However, in January 1997 it became 24 hours programming channel.

Sun TV was listed on the Bombay Stock Exchange on 24 April 2006 upon raising $133 million. It is the most viewed Tamil television channel in the world with syndicated broadcasts in several countries such as the United States, United Arab Emirates,  Singapore, Malaysia, Sri Lanka, Australia, Canada, South Africa, Qatar, Hong Kong, Europe (United Kingdom, France, Germany, Italy, Denmark, Austria, Switzerland, Netherlands and Ireland) and other countries.

Programming

Awards
Sun TV also hosts numerous film-industry–related events in Tamil Nadu and the Sun Kudumbam Awards ceremony biannually.

References

External links

Tamil-language television channels
Foreign television channels broadcasting in the United Kingdom
Television channels and stations established in 1993
Sun Group
Television stations in Chennai
Indian companies established in 1993
1993 establishments in Tamil Nadu